Penicuik railway station served the town of Penicuik, Midlothian, Scotland from 1872 to 1951 on the Penicuik Railway.

History 
The station opened on 2 September 1872 by the Penicuik Railway. The station was situated south of Valleyfield Road. There were three sidings opposite the platform, one running under Peebles Road to the west of the station to serve Bank paper mill, which specialised in producing Bank of Scotland notes. The moderately sized goods yard consisted of four sidings, the siding closest to the station serving a loading dock before entering a large brick goods shed. Another siding served the north side of the dock and the fourth siding served Valleyfield paper mill. By 1907 the goods yard had been enlarged with one additional siding and by 1932 the siding into Valleyfield Mill had been extended. The station was closed to passengers on 10 September 1951 but remained open due to the freight traffic of the paper mills. In 1961 the siding that served Bank Mill was lifted. The goods yard closed on 27 March 1967.

References

External links 

Disused railway stations in Midlothian
Former North British Railway stations
Railway stations in Great Britain opened in 1872
Railway stations in Great Britain closed in 1951
1872 establishments in Scotland
1951 disestablishments in Scotland
Penicuik